Robert Holcot, OP (c. 1290 – 1349) was an English Dominican scholastic philosopher, theologian and influential Biblical scholar.

Biography
He was born in Holcot, Northamptonshire. A follower of William of Ockham, he was nicknamed the Doctor firmus et indefatigabilis, the "strong and tireless doctor." He made important contributions to semantics, the debate over God’s knowledge of future contingent events; discussions of predestination, grace and merit; and philosophical theology more generally.

Modern interest in Holcot has been limited. His influence in the late Middle Ages, however, was clearly great, as is evidenced by the number of fourteenth- and fifteenth-century manuscripts of his work that have survived. For example, there exist 48 manuscripts of Holcot’s Questions on the Sentences (compared to 36 manuscripts of William of Ockham’s Sentences commentary). More impressive are the 175 manuscripts of his commentary on the Book of Wisdom (Lectiones super librum Sapientiae), a work that has been identified as a prime literary source for Chaucer's Nun's Priest's Tale.  Holcot was still read in the sixteenth-century when the Parisian theologian, Jacques Almain, wrote a work engaging Holcot's opinions.  The commentary on the Book of Wisdom was printed in 1480, and, subsequently, went through many editions. 

An edition of the questions on the Sentences was printed at Lyon in 1497, although it contained a cover letter stating that the manuscripts used to produce this edition were disorderly and unreliable. Unfortunately, this remains the only edition of Holcot’s Sentences available today.

Holcot died of the Black plague in 1349.

See also
 Adam de Wodeham
 Hermeticism

References

Further reading

Works and translations
 Hester Goodenough Gelber (ed.), Robert Holcot. Exploring the Boundaries of Reason: Three Questions on the Nature of God, Toronto: Pontifical Institute of Mediaeval Studies, 1983.
 Onorato Grassi (ed.), "Il 'De obiecto actus credendi' di Robert Holcot: introduzione e edizione", in Documenti e studi sulla tradizione filosofica medievale, 5, 1994, pp. 487–521.
 Paul A. Streveler and Katherine H. Tachau, (eds.), Seeing the Future Clearly: Questions on Future Contingents by Robert Holcot, Toronto: Pontifical Institute of Mediaeval Studies, 1995.
 Super sapientiam Salomonis. Konrad Winters, Köln 1476.
 In proverbia Salomonis Roberti Holcoti seu Thomae Gualesii (sive hic sive ille fuerit author) explanationes locupletissime. Petit & Frellon, Parisiis 1510 .

Studies
 John L. Farthing (1988), Thomas Aquinas and Gabriel Biel:  Images of St. Thomas Aquinas in German Nominalism on the Eve of the Reformation, Durham, NC:  Duke.
 Fritz Hoffman, Die Theologische Methode des Oxforder Dominikanerlehrers Robert Holcot, Münster:  Aschendorff, 1972.
 Leonard A. Kennedy, The Philosophy of Robert Holcot, Fourteenth-Century Skeptic, (Lewiston, NY, 1993).
 Paolo Molteni, Roberto Holcot, O.P.:  Dottrina della Grazia e della Giustificazione, Pinerolo:  Alzani, 1968.
 Heiko Oberman, The Harvest of Medieval Theology: Gabriel Biel and Late Medieval Nominalism, Grand Rapids, MI: Baker Academic, 2001.
 Heiko Oberman, 'Facientibus quod in se est Deus non denegat Gratiam: Robert Holcot, O.P. and the Beginnings of Luther's Theology', Harvard Theological Review, Vol. 55, No. 4 (Oct., 1962), pp. 317–342
 Thomas Williams, 'Transmission and Translation', in A. S. McGrade (ed.), The Cambridge Companion to Medieval Philosophy, Cambridge: Cambridge University Press, 2003.
 John T. Slotemaker and Jeffrey C. Witt, Robert Holcot, (Great Medieval Thinkers) Oxford University Press, 2016

External links

Walter Senner (2000). "Robert(us) Holcot OP (auch: R. Haldecotus, Doctor firmus et indefatigabilis)". In Bautz, Traugott. Biographisch-Bibliographisches Kirchenlexikon (BBKL) (in German) 17. Herzberg: Bautz. cols. 1151–1155. .
 Robert Holcot, by John T. Slotemaker and Jeffrey C. Witt, 2016, Published by Oxford Scholarship Online: August 2016

13th-century births
1349 deaths
English Dominicans
Scholastic philosophers
14th-century philosophers
English theologians